Glen Luchford (born 1968) is a British fashion photographer and film director. He lives and works in Venice, California.

Life and work
A self-taught photographer, Brighton-born Luchford left school at 15 and moved to London, where he worked at a hair salon.

He worked as a photographer for The Face magazine at age 20. Luchford first signed with New York based agency Art + Commerce at the age of 24. He was one of the first photographers to collaborate with model Kate Moss. In 1997, he signed exclusively to Prada, and has since shot advertising campaigns for Yves Saint Laurent, Givenchy, Chloé, Lanvin, Calvin Klein, and Gucci. He has collaborated extensively with British artist Jenny Saville with shows at the Gagosian Gallery. His editorial work has been featured in magazines such as The Face, Arena, i-D,  and British, French, American, Italian Vogue magazines, Harper's Bazaar, and Self Service Magazine.

Luchford's style is influenced by his love of cinema. His signature look is to work with cinematic lighting, both on location and in studio.

In 2001, Luchford directed the film Here to Where, about a filmmaker wanting to make a film about a man stranded at an airport. Nominated for the Michael Powell award at the Edinburgh International Film Festival, the film is considered to be an inspiration for Steven Spielberg's The Terminal.

In 2009, Luchford joined artist management agency Art Partner.

Luchford collaborated with Alessandro Michele on the re-branding of Gucci after Michele's appointment as the brand's Creative Director in 2015.
He photographed the designer's first campaigns, and created a brand new image of Gucci with Michele. His cinematic approach on the images took Gucci away from the sexualised campaigns of Michele's predecessor Frida Giannini and the Tom Ford era. He photographed Gucci's campaigns until Spring Summer 2020.

Publications
Jenny Saville & Glen Luchford: Closed Contact, Gagosian Gallery (2002)
Glen Luchford (Steidl/Dangin, 2009)
Damaged Negatives (2013)
Glen Luchford: Pictorialism (2014). A retrospective.
The Agony and the Ecstasy (2018)

Films
Here to Where (2001) – director

Collections
Luchford's work is held in the following permanent collections:
Museum of Modern Art, New York: 2 prints (as of 4 January 2023)
Victoria and Albert Museum, London: 47 prints (as of 4 January 2023)
J. Paul Getty Museum, Los Angeles: 6 prints (as of 4 January 2023)

References

External links

Photographers from California
Fashion photographers
Living people
1968 births
Photographers from Sussex
British emigrants to the United States